Screaming Eagles may refer to:

Military
 101st Airborne Division (United States), a U.S. Army Division
 319th Missile Squadron, a U.S. Air Force ICBM operations unit
 VF-51, a U.S. Navy fighter squadron active 1943–1995

Sports
 Screaming Eagles (MLS supporters association), a fan group of soccer team D.C. United
 Cape Breton Screaming Eagles, a Canadian junior ice hockey team in the QMJHL
 Espanola Screaming Eagles, a Canadian junior ice hockey team in Espanola, Ontario, 1962—2003
 First Nation Screaming Eagles, a Canadian junior ice hockey team in Thunder Bay, Ontario, 2010–2011
 Huron University Screeaming Eagles, the sports teams of Huron University, South Dakota, U.S.
 Miami Screaming Eagles, a founding team of the World Hockey Association that moved before the inaugural season started
 Minnesota State Screaming Eagles, a fictional American football team in the TV series Coach
 Salt Lake Screaming Eagles, an American indoor football team
 Southern Indiana Screaming Eagles, the athletic program of the University of Southern Indiana

Other uses 
 Screaming Eagles (film), a 1956 film starring Tom Tryon
 Sgt. Savage and his Screaming Eagles, a short-lived G.I. Joe toy line
 Boston College Marching Band
 "Screaming Eagles", a song by Sabaton from Coat of Arms

See also
 Screaming eagle (disambiguation)